Ovrazhny is a rural locality (a settlement) in Krepinskoye Rural Settlement, Kalachyovsky District, Volgograd Oblast, Russia. The population was 306 as of 2010. There are 9 streets in Ovrazhny.

Geography 
Ovrazhny is located 82 km southeast of Kalach-na-Donu (the district's administrative centre) by road. Krepinsky is the nearest rural locality.

References 

Rural localities in Kalachyovsky District